The David Frost House is an historic house at 26 Gray Street in Cambridge, Massachusetts.  It is a -story wood-frame house, five bays wide, with twin interior chimneys and a typical Federal period center-hall plan.  It was built in 1815, and was originally located on Massachusetts Avenue, then a relatively rural area.  It was relocated to its present site in 1889, when Massachusetts Avenue became a desirable location to build larger, more fashionable houses, after the arrival of public transit.

The house was built in 1815 and added to the National Register of Historic Places in 1983.

See also
National Register of Historic Places listings in Cambridge, Massachusetts

References

Houses completed in 1815
Houses on the National Register of Historic Places in Cambridge, Massachusetts
Federal architecture in Massachusetts
Relocated buildings and structures in Massachusetts